Enric Casasses i Figueres (Barcelona, 1951) is a Spanish poet who writes in the Catalan language.

Casasses published his first two books of poetry, La bragueta encallada (1972) and La cosa aquella (1982), in alternative editions. In 1991, Casasses published a second edition of La cosa aquella.

Casasses has written over 25 books of poetry and received awards for: No hi érem (Premi de la Crítica in 1993), Calç (Premi Carles Riba in 1996) and Plaça Raspall (Premi Joan Alcover in 1998).

References 

 

Spanish male poets
Writers from Barcelona
1951 births
Living people
20th-century Spanish poets
21st-century Spanish poets